Riders of Black Mountain is a 1940 Western film directed by Sam Newfield, under his pseudonym of Peter Stewart. It stars Tim McCoy, Pauline Haddon, and Rex Lease.

Plot
A US Marshal is dispatched to solve a string of hold-ups. Disguising himself as a professional gambler, he believes he's found out who is feeding information to the outlaw gang committing the robberies. So he lets word get out that a valuable "shipment" is coming to town on the stage, knowing that if the stage is in fact robbed, he will know who the "inside man" is. However, things don't go quite as planned.

Release
Producers Releasing Corporation released the film originally in 1940. Alpha Video gave Riders of Black Mountain a DVD release in December 2009.

References

External links

Films directed by Sam Newfield
Producers Releasing Corporation films
1940 films
1940 Western (genre) films
American Western (genre) films
American black-and-white films
1940s American films